Lars Grorud (born 2 July 1983 in Tønsberg) is a retired Norwegian football defender.

He joined Brann at the start of the 2011 season.

Career statistics

Club

References

1983 births
Living people
Sportspeople from Tønsberg
Norwegian footballers
Association football defenders
Eik-Tønsberg players
FK Tønsberg players
Sogndal Fotball players
SK Brann players
Fredrikstad FK players
Sandefjord Fotball players
Norwegian First Division players
Eliteserien players